Saint-Laurent-sur-Mer (literally Saint-Laurent on Sea) is a commune in the Calvados department in the Normandy region in northwestern France. The town is located not far from Omaha Beach, where, in World War II, Allied forces landed during D-Day.

It was also the location of a British Commando raid - Operation Curlew during January 1942.

Population

See also
Communes of the Calvados department

References

Communes of Calvados (department)
Calvados communes articles needing translation from French Wikipedia
Populated coastal places in France